Joseph Tetteh Anang (born 8 June 2000) is a professional footballer who plays as a goalkeeper for  club West Ham United.

Early life
Born in Ghana, Anang moved to England in his teenage years. Before playing as a goalkeeper, he played as a centre-back.

Club career

West Ham United
Anang began playing in the youth team for Danbort in his native Ghana, before moving to Ghana Premier League club Wa All Stars. He went on trial with West Ham United, ultimately signing for the club as an academy scholar in July 2017. He had to wait until March 2018 to play for the club's under-18 team, having not gained international clearance, during which he also trained with the first team alongside goalkeeper Adrián. Anang signed his first professional contract with West Ham on 1 July 2018. He made five appearances in the EFL Trophy for West Ham's under-21 team. Anang signed a new contract with West Ham on 15 December 2020, with the agreement running until the summer of 2024.

Loan to Stevenage
Anang joined League Two club Stevenage on a season-long loan agreement on 15 June 2021. He made his English Football League debut in Stevenage's 1–0 victory against Barrow on 7 August 2021. Anang made 18 appearances during the first half of the 2021–22 season, before returning to West Ham in January 2022.

Loan to St Patrick's Athletic
On 28 January 2022, it was announced that Anang had signed for League of Ireland Premier Division side St Patrick's Athletic on loan until the end of November, ahead of their 2022 season, following a recommendation of the club by former West Ham United teammate Alfie Lewis who played for the club in 2021. On 11 February 2022, he made his debut for the club in the 2022 President of Ireland's Cup against Shamrock Rovers at Tallaght Stadium, as his side lost 5–4 on penalties after a 1–1 draw. He made his league debut for the club a week later, keeping a clean sheet in a 3–0 win away to Dublin rivals Shelbourne at Tolka Park. He made his first appearance in European football on 21 July 2022 in a 1–1 draw with Slovenian side NŠ Mura in the UEFA Europa Conference League. Anang was the penalty shootout "hero" in the second leg in Slovenia as his side won the shootout 6–5 following a 0–0 draw after extra time. Anang's loan was cut short in August 2022 with Pat's manager Tim Clancy stating that Anang refused to travel to Bulgaria for a UEFA Europa Conference League fixture against CSKA Sofia unless he was allowed to end his loan spell early after the club exited the competition.

Loan to Derby County
On 14 August 2022, Anang was recalled from his loan at St Patrick's Athletic and sent to Derby County on a season-long loan. He suffered a 'small arm fracture' in training shortly after signing for the club, an injury that kept him out of action for several months. The loan was terminated in January 2023.

International career
He has represented England at under-20 level, making his debut as a 79th-minute substitute in a 3–0 victory against Iceland under-20s on 19 November 2019.

Career statistics

References

2000 births
Living people
Ghanaian footballers
English footballers
West Ham United F.C. players
Stevenage F.C. players
St Patrick's Athletic F.C. players
Derby County F.C. players
Association football goalkeepers
English Football League players
England youth international footballers
Expatriate association footballers in the Republic of Ireland
League of Ireland players